Nemanja Lazić may refer to:
Nemanja Lazić (footballer, born March 1990), Serbian association football player
Nemanja Lazić (footballer, born April 1990), Serbian association football player who plays for FK Sloboda Užice